General Salah Yaqub is a Somali military general. He is the incumbent the Deputy Commander of the 27th Division of Somali Armed Forces

References

Living people
Year of birth missing (living people)
Somalian generals